Hurd's Deep (or Hurd Deep) is an underwater valley in the English Channel, northwest of the Channel Islands. Its maximum depth is about 180 m (590 ft; 98 fathoms), making it the deepest point in the English Channel.

Etymology
It is most probable the feature was named after Captain Thomas Hurd RN (1747–1823), by Admiral Martin White.

Description
It terminates abruptly at the western end. It is the deepest point on the English channel.

Late Quaternary origin
The underwater valley system found on the floor of the eastern English Channel formed from a catastrophic flood which was caused by a breaching of a rock dam at the Strait of Dover, which released a huge proglacial lake in the southern North Sea basin. The flood scoured the former river systems to form Hurd's Deep in late Quaternary times.

Pleistocene glacial refugium
During the ice ages, when the sea level dropped, most of the English Channel was dry land. Hurd's Deep likely remained as a sea. During the Pleistocene it is thought to have been a glacial refugium.

Seabed

Dumping
Following the First World War, Hurd's Deep was used by the British Government as a dumping ground for both chemical and conventional munitions.   was scuttled there in 1921.  Following the Second World War, it was used to dump military equipment, munitions and weaponry left behind by the ousted German invaders of the Channel Islands. Routine dumping of British munitions carried on until 1974.

Between 1946 and 1973 the area was also used for the dumping of low and intermediate level radioactive wastes. 28,500 barrels of waste – including plutonium, which has a half-life of 24,100 years – were disposed of into the Deep during this period.

Shipwrecks
The British submarine  sank in Hurd's Deep in 1951 with the loss of 75 lives.

In popular culture
In Harry Collingwood's science fiction stories about the Flying-Fish airship-submarine, the Flying-Fish is hidden in Hurd's Deep between adventures.

Notes, references and sources

Notes

References

Sources

 

 

English Channel
Radioactive waste repositories